Corynofrea is a genus of longhorn beetles of the subfamily Lamiinae.

 Corynofrea camerunica Breuning, 1950
 Corynofrea mirabilis Aurivillius, 1910
 Corynofrea nigritarsis Breuning, 1940
 Corynofrea rubra (Jordan, 1903)

References

Crossotini